Patrick William Skehan (30 September 1909 in New York City – 9 September 1980) was an American Old Testament semitic scholar.

Education 
Skehan received his B.A. from Fordham University (1929), and studied theology at St. Joseph's Seminary (known as Dunwoodie). He studied Scripture and Semitic Languages at Catholic University of America, Washington, DC, where he earned his doctorate and obtained an Doctor of Sacred Theology in the Old Testament (1938). His doctoral advisor was Edward P. Arbez, and his dissertation for his doctorate in Sacred Theology was entitled The Literary Relationship Between the Book of Wisdom and the Protocanonical Wisdom Books of the Old Testament.

Religious order 
He was ordained as a priest in the Catholic Church. Skehan was ordained a priest at St. Joseph's Seminary on September 23, 1933.

Academic work 
He was the Chair of the Department of Semitic and Egyptian Languages and Literatures at The Catholic University of America, Washington, DC. He was appointed Secretary of the Advisory Committee for the Corpus Scriptorum Christianorum Orientalium (C.S.C.O.).

Teaching 
He taught Hebrew Hebrew, Aramaic, and Syriac at the Department of Semitic and Egyptian Languages and Literatures at the Catholic University of America, and a visiting professor at the Pontifical Biblical Institute in Rome.

Editorial work 
Skehan participated in the translation of the New American Bible. He was associate editor on several occasions of the Catholic Biblical Quarterly, associate editor of Old Testament Abstracts, and editor of the association's monograph series (1973–75). He also worked on the New Catholic Encyclopedia.

Archaeological 
In 1947, when William Foxwell Albright conducted an archaeological exploration in Egypt, he asked Skehan to be a visiting lecturer in his place at Johns Hopkins. He agreed and did this for Albright on other occasions between 1947 and 1956. Skehan was also a guest professor during the 1969–1970 academic year at the Pontifical Biblical Institute in Rome.

In 1953, Skehan was chosen as a member of the Dead Sea Scrolls editorial team, along with Frank Moore Cross, John Allegro, John Strugnell, Dominique Barthélemy, Jean Starcky, Claus-Hunno Hunziger, Josef T. Milik, and Roland de Vaux who was the project director.

Organizations 
Skehan was involved with many organizations and their projects including the Catholic Biblical Association, the Confraternity of Christian Doctrine, the American Schools of Oriental Research, the American Oriental Society, and the Pontifical Biblical Commission.

Recognitions and distinctions 
Skehan's work and contribution to the study of Scripture was recognized and honored by the Holy See. He was named Monsignor by Pope Pius XII on June 17, 1954, appointed Domestic Prelate by Pope John XXIII on December 2, 1958, and awarded Benemerenti Medal by Pope Paul VI on December 29, 1964.

In 1974 The Catholic Biblical Quarterly issued a festschrift in his honor, edited by one of his students, Roland E. Murphy (O.Carm.). One of his students, Alexander A. Di Lella (O.F.M.), wrote a tribute to him published in The Catholic Biblical Quarterly. Of his teacher Di Lella says: "He was more than a dedicated teacher and scholar. He was above all a loyal churchman and devout priest, a Christian gentleman, and a superlative human being."

Works

Thesis

Books

See also
List of Catholic University of America people

References

Sources 

1909 births
1980 deaths
Dead Sea Scrolls
Old Testament scholars
Semiticists
Bible commentators
American priests
Catholic University of America
20th-century American clergy